William Collier (11 December 1892 – 17 April 1954) was a Scottish footballer who played for Raith Rovers, Sheffield Wednesday, Kettering Town (as player-manager) and Scotland.

His introduction into professional football was delayed until he was in his late 20s due to World War I, during which he served in the Fife and Forfar Yeomanry and the Black Watch. Barely two years after making his first appearance for Raith (where alongside the likes of David Morris he was part of the side that secured their highest ever league finishes: 3rd in 1921–22 and 4th in 1923–24), he had been selected for his only international cap, against Wales in February 1922.

His younger brother Jock Collier was also a footballer.

References

Sources

External links

 

1892 births
1954 deaths
Scottish footballers
Scotland international footballers
Association football wing halves
Footballers from Fife
People from Dysart, Fife 
Raith Rovers F.C. players
Sheffield Wednesday F.C. players
Scottish Football League players
British Yeomanry soldiers
Black Watch soldiers 
British Army personnel of World War I
English Football League players
Kettering Town F.C. players
Scottish football managers
Association football player-managers
Kettering Town F.C. managers
Dartford F.C. managers
Crystal Palace F.C. non-playing staff